"Walking in the Rain" is a 1978 song by Australian band Flash and the Pan.  The song was covered by Grace Jones and released as a single from her album Nightclubbing.

Background
The song was originally composed and recorded by Australian band Flash and the Pan (the songwriting and producing team of ex-Easybeats Harry Vanda and George Young), and included on their eponymous 1979 debut album. 

In 1981 it was covered by Grace Jones, who included it on Nightclubbing, her second Compass Point album and later released as the last single from the record. The song was released in various remixes, among them a 7:30 12" mix including additional vocal overdubs, first released on CD in 2014 on the deluxe edition of Nightclubbing. The B-side, "Peanut Butter", credited to the Compass Point All Stars, was actually an instrumental dub version of "Pull Up to the Bumper", which was unavailable on CD until 2014 when her album Nightclubbing was remastered. "Walking in the Rain" was included in Jones' music documentary A One Man Show, and a snapshot from the video was later used as the cover of the 1985 Warm Leatherette reissue.

Track listing (Grace Jones version)
7" single (UK, Australia)
A. "Walking in the Rain" (edited version) – 3:52
B. "Peanut Butter" – 3:07

7" single (Germany)
A. "Walking in the Rain" – 4:18
B. "Pull Up to the Bumper" – 4:40

12" single (Australia)
A. "Walking in the Rain" (edited version) – 4:58
B1. "Peanut Butter" – 3:07
B2. "Feel Up" (extended version) – 5:06

12" single (Germany)
A. "Walking in the Rain" – 7:25
B1. "Pull Up to the Bumper" (remixed version) – 7:15
B2. "Peanut Butter" – 3:05

12" single (Canada)
A1. "Walking in the Rain" – 7:25
A2. "Walking in the Rain" – 4:18
B1. "Pull Up to the Bumper" – 7:15
B2. "Feel Up" – 5:13

Chart performance

References

1981 singles
Flash and the Pan songs
Grace Jones songs
Songs written by George Young (rock musician)
Songs written by Harry Vanda
1978 songs
Island Records singles
Song recordings produced by Alex Sadkin